

Albums

Studio albums

Remix albums

Live albums

Soundtracks

Compilations

Export albums

Special editions

Spoken word

Extended plays

Singles

As lead artist
{|class="wikitable" style="text-align:center;"
|-
! rowspan="2" width="5"|Year
! rowspan="2" width="247"|Single details
! colspan="2" width="80"|Top positions
! rowspan="2" width="86"|Sales
! rowspan="2" width="130"|Album
! rowspan="2" width="70"|Label
|- style="font-size:smaller;"
! width="40"| CZ
! width="40"| SK
|-
|1982
|align="left"|"Detská diskotéka" with Ivan Krajíček
|
|
|
|rowspan="2"|non-album single
|OPUS
|-
|rowspan="2"|1983
|align="left"|"Kapela snov"
|
|
|
|rowspan="7"|Supraphon
|-
|align="left"|"O tom budem píseň hrát"
|
|
|
|Darinka
|-
|1984
|align="left"|"Zvonky štěstí" with Karel Gott
|
|
|
200,000
|(VA) Tip Top 2
|-
|1986
|align="left"|"Tanec v daždi"
|
|
|
|rowspan="2"|non-album single
|-
|rowspan="2"|1987
|align="left"|"Kto chce"
|
|
|
|-
|align="left"|"Čo o mne vieš"
|
|
|
|Čo o mne vieš
|-
|1990
|align="left"|"Skús ma nájsť"
|
|
|
|non-album single
|-
|rowspan="3"|1996
|align="left"|"I See You There"
|
|
|
|rowspan="3"|What You See is What You Get|rowspan="3"|BMG
|-
|align="left"|"Our Lovin'"
|
|
|
|-
|align="left"|"What You See is What You Get"
|
|
|
|-
! colspan=9| Airplay singles
|-
|rowspan="3"|2006
|align="left"|"Túžim"
|rowspan="2"|30
| 27
|
|rowspan="3"|D1
|rowspan="3"|Epic
|-
|align="left"|"Nádych, výdych"
| —
|
|-
|align="left"|"Party DJ" featuring Rytmus
| —
| —
|
|-
|2007
|align="left"|"Štěstí chce tebe"
| 55
| —
|
| non-album single
| Sony
|-
|rowspan="2"|2008
|align="left"|"Voľný pád" featuring Orion
| 54
| 44
|
|rowspan="2"|D2: Remixy
| Epic
|-
|align="left"|"Slowly (MJ Cole 2-Step Remix)"
| —
| —
|
|Prolific
|-
|rowspan="2"|2009
|align="left"|"Zvonky štěstí 2009" with Karel Gott
| 47
| —
|
|rowspan="2"|Šťastné a veselé
|rowspan="2"|Universal
|-
|align="left"|"Šťastné vianoce"
| —
| 48
|
|-
|rowspan="4"|2011
|align="left"|"Naskoč a leť"
| —
| 53
|
|rowspan="3"|Stereo
|rowspan="5"|EMI
|-
|align="left"|"Nebo, peklo, raj" with Tomi Popovič
| 41
| 1
|
|-
|align="left"|"Fóbia"
| —
| 75
|
|-
|align="left"|"Santa Baby" (by Joan Javits & Philip Springer)
| —
| 46
|
|Šťastné a veselé
|-
| 2012
|align="left"|"Ďaleko mi neuleť"
| —
| —
|
|Stereo
|-
| 2013
|align=left|"Zmena má prísť"
| —
|42
|
|rowspan=2| non-album single
|
|-
| 2015
|align=left|"Chcem znamenie"
| 59
| 62
|
| Warner
|-
| colspan="9" style="font-size: 8pt"| "—" denotes a single that did not chart or was not released in that region.
|}
NotesA  "Slowly" was also released on vinyl as a promotional single in UK.

As featured artist

Other appearances

NotesA  Rok psa by Hugo  charted at number twenty-three on the Czech Albums Chart.B  Various artists compilation 20Ers peaked at number forty-five on the Czech Albums Chart.C'''  The PSH's set Epilog scored at number four on the Czech Albums Chart.

See also
 The 100 Greatest Slovak Albums of All Time

 References 

General

Specific

 External links 

 DaraRolins.cz (official website)
 
 Dara Rolins at Billboard''

 Darina Rolincová on Discogs
 

Pop music discographies